Air launching is the practice of releasing a rocket, missile, parasite aircraft or other aircraft payload from a mother ship or launch aircraft.  The payload craft or missile is often tucked under the wing of the larger mother ship and then "dropped" while in flight.  It may also be stored within a bomb bay, beneath the main fuselage or even on the back of the carrier aircraft, as in the case of the D-21 drone. Air launching provides several advantages over ground launching, giving the smaller craft an altitude and range boost, while saving it the weight of the fuel and equipment needed to take off on its own.

History

One of the earliest uses of air launching used an airship as a carrier and docking station for biplane parasite fighters.  These planes would connect to their mothership through a trapeze-like rig, mounted to the top of the upper wing, that attached to a hook dangling from the bottom of the dirigible above.  Fighters could be both launched and retrieved this way, giving the airship the speed and striking power of fixed-wing craft, while giving the fighters the range and lingering time of an airship.  With advances in airplane technology, especially in range, the value of a dirigible mothership was reduced and the concept became obsolete.

The parasite fighter concept was later revived several times, in an attempt to solve the problem of how to protect bombers from fighter attack.  The Convair B-36 was used to air launch several prototype fighters for defense, but none offered performance that could match ground-launched fighters — even the largest bomber ever mass-produced was too small a mothership for the jet age — and docking presented its own problems.

Air launch is the standard way to launch air-to-surface missiles and air-to-air missiles and is mainly used for rocket-powered craft, allowing them to conserve their fuel until lifted to altitude by a larger aircraft.  The B-29, B-50, and B-52 have all served in the carrier role for research programs such as the Bell X-1 and X-15.

In the 1960s the SR-71 aircraft was used to launch the Lockheed D-21/M-21 drone to speeds of up to Mach 3. However, this added a degree of difficulty due to the shock wave pattern around an aircraft at supersonic speeds. After three successful tests, the fourth resulted in a collision with the carrier aircraft, in which both craft were destroyed and one crew member drowned. The project was subsequently abandoned.

During the development of the Space Shuttle orbiter in the 1970s, NASA used two modified Boeing 747 airliners, known as the Shuttle Carrier Aircraft, to launch the Space Shuttle Enterprise, a crewed atmospheric test vehicle used to test the orbiter's approach and landing capabilities. These aircraft were subsequently used throughout the Space Shuttle Program to transport the shuttles across long distances.

The Pegasus launch vehicle became the first air-launched orbital rocket when it was launched on April 5, 1990 by the private company Orbital Sciences Corporation (now a part of Northrop Grumman), from a NASA-owned B-52 Stratofortress. It has flown more than 40 times since, launched mostly from the company's own Lockheed L-1011 known as Stargazer. Orbital Sciences was developing the Pegasus II launcher that would have dropped from the purpose-built Scaled Composites Stratolaunch; capacity to low Earth orbit was projected to be 

In the early 2000s, the B-52 was used to launch the X-43 hypersonic testbed aircraft.

Recently, the air launch method has gained popularity with commercial launch providers. The Ansari X-Prize $10 million purse was won by a team led by Burt Rutan's Scaled Composites, launching the SpaceShipOne from the purpose-built White Knight carrier aircraft. AirLaunch LLC developed QuickReach small satellite launch system that validated the concept by dropping a test payload in-flight from the cargo bay of an unmodified C-17 aircraft. Other commercial enterprises developing air launch systems for spaceflight include Stratolaunch Systems, Generation Orbit, which plans to use a Learjet 35 aircraft to launch orbital, suborbital and atmospheric rockets. Virgin Orbit is developing the uncrewed satellite launcher LauncherOne and Virgin Galactic the suborbital crewed spacecraft SpaceShipTwo, the latter as a technological successor to SpaceShipOne.

See also
Composite aircraft
Parasite aircraft
Mother ship
Pegasus (rocket)
Air launch to orbit
Airborne aircraft carrier

References

External links 
 A Study of Air Launch Methods for RLVs (AIAA 2001)
 

Launch
Missile operation
Rocketry